The Copa Verde is an annual regional knockout football competition in Brazil that started in 2014, and played by 24 teams from the North and Central-West regions, plus Espírito Santo (Espírito Santo state was included because they competed in the old Copa Centro Oeste).

Initially, the champion of the tournament gained a place in the  next year's Copa Sudamericana. With the changes implemented by CONMEBOL in 2016 causes a competition no longer qualify in Copa Sudamericana from edition. The champion will now have a spot in the third round of the Copa do Brasil of the following year. The cup is organized by the Brazilian Football Confederation (CBF), with two-legged playoff games played from between the 24 participating teams.

History
The tournament was created with the purpose of making a North Region version of the Copa do Nordeste, hence the name Verde, meaning green, is an allusion to the Amazon Forest. The competition was expanded to include clubs from the Central-West Region and from Espírito Santo state (as the state competed in the defunct Copa Centro-Oeste).  The competition was officially announced in September by the competitions director of the Brazilian Football Confederation.

In the community
Since its creation in 2014, Copa Verde has been committed to sustainable practices and the preservation of the environment. With the legacy of respect for nature already consolidated and a growing reach throughout its editions, it has earned the certificate of Brazil's first Zero Carbon competition. With the trophies made of certified wood, the Brazilian Football Confederation, through its sustainability policy, has already promoted educational contests, tree planting, the use of certified paper, and the exchange of PET bottles for tickets as some of its actions on behalf of the environment.

Besides the concern with flora, Copa Verde also looks carefully at the species that make up the Brazilian fauna. Since the 2020 edition, the jaguar and the hyacinth macaw have been printed on the clubs' shirts with special patches. The initiative aims to alert and pay tribute to these two endangered species in the Amazon and Pantanal wetlands, respectively.

List of champions

Note 1: Losing semi-finalists are listed in alphabetical order.
Note 2: On July 28, 2014, the 2014 Copa Verde title was awarded to Paysandu, due to irregularities on the squad of Brasília. Brasília appealed against this decision and obtained a suspension which reversed this decision temporarily. A final decision by the Superior Court of Sports Justice (STJD) declared Brasília as the champion.

Records and statistics

Finalists

Performance by State

References

 
Verde
Recurring sporting events established in 2014